The Global Partnership for Education (GPE) is a multi-stakeholder partnership and funding platform that aims to strengthen education systems in developing countries in order to dramatically increase the number of children who are in school and learning. GPE brings together developing countries, donors, international organizations, civil society, teacher organizations, the private sector and foundations. The Global Partnership for Education is the only global fund solely dedicated to education in developing countries.

History 

Launched in 2002, the Global Partnership for Education was originally known as the Education for All – Fast Track Initiative. It was launched to accelerate progress towards the Millennium Development Goal of universal primary education by 2015. 

In 2013, Alice Albright joined as Chief Executive Officer and Julia Gillard, former Australian Prime Minister, was appointed Chair of GPE's Board. She led a successful second replenishment of GPE's resources for 2015–2018, bringing in US$28.5 billion in new commitments from developing countries and donor partners. Additionally, in 2016, Rihanna became GPE's first Global Ambassador. In this role Rihanna has encouraged world leaders and policymakers to boost their support for global education and education in emergencies through GPE. 

Since its inception, GPE has grown from partnering with 7 developing countries in 2002 to close to 70 countries in 2019.

Scope and focus 

GPE supports close to 70 developing country governments to develop good quality education sector plans. GPE supports nations with high numbers of out-of-school children and weak school completion rates. Also, GPE focuses on reaching the children that are most marginalized and vulnerable including girls, children with disabilities, and those who live in countries that are characterized by extreme poverty and/or conflict. Almost 50% of GPE funds go to countries affected by fragility and conflict.

Funding 
GPE leverages the financial support of donor countries, international organizations, the private sector and philanthropy to strengthen education systems in developing countries. GPE also encourages partner developing countries to allocate 20% of their national budget to education, with a significant proportion (45%) for primary education. Since 2003, GPE has received US$5.7 billion from donors. Private and philanthropic funders include the Children's Investment Fund Foundation, Dubai Cares, European Commission, the LEGO Foundation, Open Society Foundations, and the Rockefeller Foundation.

Critics have noted that there is some redundancy in GPE funding, most of which is transferred through the World Bank or UNICEF before reaching its intended recipient. However this redundancy must be balanced against its democratic and inclusive governance structure.

Related data 
Since 2002, there are 77 million more children in school in GPE partner countries and US$5.3 billion in grants have been allocated since 2003, including US$2.4 billion to partner countries affected by fragility and conflict.

Despite progress, there is still much work to be done. To date, there are 258 million children, adolescents and youth who are not in school. This includes 59 million children of primary school age, 62 million adolescents of lower secondary school age, and 138 million youth of upper secondary school age.

References

External links 

Education for All blog

International development agencies
Educational organizations based in the United States